Los Angeles City Council District 1 is one of the 15 districts of the Los Angeles City Council, representing sections of Northeast Los Angeles and Northwest Los Angeles. Councilmember Eunisses Hernandez is the current representative for CD 1; she took office on December 12, 2022, the next election for District 1 will be in 2026.

Between 1923 and 1987 District 1 represented all, then parts, of the San Fernando Valley. It was redistricted in 1987 to cover an area northwest and north of Downtown Los Angeles, to provide another majority-Hispanic council district in the city.

Geography

Current neighborhoods
According to the district's website, the 1st Council District includes all or parts of the following 22 neighborhoods:  

Glassell Park
Cypress Park
Highland Park
Mount Washington
Sycamore Grove
Solano Canyon
Elysian Park
Echo Park
Westlake
Angelino Heights
Temple Beaudry
Chinatown
Forgotten Edge
Lincoln Heights
Montecito Heights
Pico Union 
Adams-Normandie
University Park
Victory Heights
Koreatown
Mid Cities
MacArthur Park

The 1st District is separated from Downtown by the 110 freeway, and the boundary continues northeast until it reaches York Boulevard in Highland Park.  For additional reference, see the official City of Los Angeles map of District 1.

The district is approximately 13.5 square miles in area, making it the city's third-smallest council district.

Historic District 1 boundaries

A new city charter effective in 1925  replaced the former plurality "at large" voting system for a nine-member council with a district system, having a 15-member council. Each district was to be approximately equal in population, based upon the voting in the previous gubernatorial election; thus redistricting was done every four years. (At present, redistricting is done every ten years, based upon the preceding U.S. census results.) The numbering system established in 1925 for City Council districts began with No. 1 in the north of the city, the San Fernando Valley, and ended with No. 15 in the south, the Harbor area.

The rough boundaries or descriptions have been:

1925: All of the San Fernando Valley, some of the Santa Monica Mountains reaching south to the Sherman district, the Cahuenga Pass, the Hollywood Hills, Griffith Park, Atwater and the eastern part of the Los Feliz District south to approximately Santa Monica Boulevard.

1926: The San Fernando Valley, with a district office in the Roscoe neighborhood (now Sun Valley).

1928: "The eastern section of the south boundary . . . is changed from Sunset Boulevard to Fountain  Avenue. . . . The westerly portion of the south boundary . . . is a prolongation of the crest of the Santa Monica Mountains. . . . The east boundary is Allesandro Street and the east city limits and the west and north boundaries [in the San Fernando Valley] are the city limits."

1932-33: All of the San Fernando Valley, the Atwater section, and the territory east of Griffith Park, east of Vermont Avenue and north of Fountain Avenue.

1937: The San Fernando Valley, the Los Feliz section east of Griffith Park Drive and north of Franklin Avenue, the section between Vermont and Talmadge avenues south to Santa Monica Boulevard, and the Riverside Drive area west of Glendale Boulevard.

1940: With the rise of the Valley population, the 1st District gave up the Los Feliz and Atwater areas, with its southeast boundary retreating to a point near Cahuenga Boulevard and Mulholland Highway. It was still the only Valley district.

1971: The 1st District was the largest geographic area in the city, about 76 square miles, which was a sixth the total area of Los Angeles. It included Arleta, Lake View Terrace, Mission Hills, Pacoima, Shadow Hills, Sunland-Tujunga, Sun Valley and Sylmar.

1987: After the death of incumbent Howard Finn, the district was transferred to Northeast Los Angeles and Northwest Los Angeles, in order to provide an additional seat for representing the increased Hispanic population in L.A.

Population

As of the 2000 Census, there were 222,165 people residing in the district. The population density was 16,456.67/mi2.  The racial and ethnic makeup of the district was 75.5% Latino, 5.4% white, 2.6% African American, 0.3% Native American, 15.1% Asian, 0.1% from other races, and 1.0% from two or more races.

There were 19,252 households, out of which 44.8% had children under the age of 18 living with them, 72.3% were married couples living together, 8.3% had a female householder with no husband present, and 16.4% were non-families. 12.4% of all households were made up of individuals, and 4.7% had someone living alone who was 65 years of age or older. The average household size was 3.05 and the average family size was 3.35.

In the district, 70%, 154,927 people, were over the age of 18 while the remaining thirty percent, 67,238 people, were under the age of 18.

Officeholders

San Fernando Valley

Northeast-Northwest Los Angeles

See also
 Los Angeles City Council
 Los Angeles City Council districts
 List of Los Angeles municipal election returns
 Sunland-Tujunga: Los Angeles City Council redistricting — how District 1 was moved from the Valley in 1986.

References

Note: Access to the Los Angeles Times links requires the use of a library card.

External links
 Official Los Angeles City Council District 1 website
 City of Los Angeles: Map of District 1

LACD01
LACD01
LACD01
Chinatown, Los Angeles
Cypress Park, Los Angeles
LACD01
LACD01
Glassell Park, Los Angeles
Highland Park, Los Angeles
Lincoln Heights, Los Angeles
Mount Washington, Los Angeles
Montecito Heights, Los Angeles
Pico-Union, Los Angeles
Westlake, Los Angeles